Meagan Mercedes Harbison Felipe (born 1 April 1995) is an American-born Dominican footballer who plays as a centre back for the Dominican Republic women's national team.

Early life
Harbison was born in San Diego, California and raised in the Rancho Peñasquitos neighborhood.

College career
Harbison has attended the Pepperdine University in Malibu, California.

International career
Harbison's mother is Dominican. She made her senior debut for the Dominican Republic on 18 February 2021 in a friendly home match against Puerto Rico.

Personal life
Harbison's younger sister Hailey Harbison is also a footballer who plays for North Carolina Courage in the National Women's Soccer League. She is of Irish descent through her father, while her mother is Afro-Dominican.

References

1995 births
Living people
Citizens of the Dominican Republic through descent
Dominican Republic women's footballers
Women's association football central defenders
Dominican Republic women's international footballers
Dominican Republic people of European American descent
Dominican Republic people of Irish descent
Twin sportspeople
Dominican Republic twins
Soccer players from San Diego
American women's soccer players
Pepperdine Waves women's soccer players
American people of Irish descent
American sportspeople of Dominican Republic descent
American twins